Caenorhabditis kamaaina is a species of nematodes in the genus Caenorhabditis. Prior to 2014, it was referred to as C. sp. 15. The type isolate was collected in Kauai, Hawaii.

This species is the most basal in the 'Japonica' group, the sister clade to the 'Elegans' group, in the 'Elegans' supergroup.

References

External links 

kamaaina
Fauna of Hawaii
Biota of Kauai
Nematodes described in 2014